Litteris et Artibus is a Swedish royal medal established in 1853 by Charles XV of Sweden, who was then crown prince. It is awarded to people who have made important contributions to culture, especially music, dramatic art and literature.

The obverse side of the medal has the image of the current King while the reverse has the text "Litteris et artibus" (Latin: Letters and Arts).

Recipients 

 1857 – Karolina Bock
 1865 – Elise Hwasser
 1869 – Louise Michaëli
 1871 – Henriette Nissen-Saloman
 1874 – Béla Kéler
 1885 – Bertha Tammelin
 1886 – Ellen Hartman
 1890 – Dina Edling
 1891 – Thecla Åhlander, Agi Lindegren, Carolina Östberg
 1895 – Mathilda Grabow
 1896 – Agnes Branting
 1899 – John Forsell
 1900 – Adelina Patti
 1906 – Martina Bergman-Österberg
 1907 – Armas Järnefelt
 1914 – Alice Tegnér
 1914 – Anna Bergström-Simonsson
 1915 – Anna Oscàr
 1916 – Hugo Alfvén, Harriet Bosse, Carl Boberg
 1920 – Nanny Larsén-Todsen, Wilhelm Kempff
 1921 – Lotten Dahlgren
 1922 – Sigrid Leijonhufvud
 1923 – Helena Nyblom
 1924 – Märta Måås-Fjetterström
 1925 – Pauline Brunius, Ellen Roosval von Hallwyl
 1926 – Carl Malmsten
 1927 – Ida von Schulzenheim
 1928 – Tora Teje
 1932 – Oskar Lindberg
 1934 – Olof Winnerstrand
 1937 – Greta Garbo
 1940 – Irma Björck
 1950 – Tyra Lundgren
 1952 – Marian Anderson
 1960 – Birgit Nilsson
 1968 – Nicolai Gedda
 1969 – Eric Ericson, Elisabeth Söderström
 1973 – Erland Josephson
 1975 – Astrid Lindgren, Erik Saedén, Margaretha Krook
 1976 – Margareta Hallin
 1977 – Birgit Cullberg, Alf Henrikson, Lars-Erik Larsson, Allan Pettersson
 1978 – Povel Ramel, Gunnar de Frumerie, Dag Wirén
 1979 – Anders Ek, Gunn Wållgren
 1980 – Erik Bruhn
 1981 – Tage Danielsson, Lars Johan Werle, Hans Alfredson
 1982 – Ernst-Hugo Järegård, Götz Friedrich
 1983 – Birgitta Valberg, Ingvar Kjellson
 1986 – Bengt Hambraeus, Jan Malmsjö, Sif Ruud
 1987 – Nils Poppe
 1988 – Per Myrberg
 1989 – Bibi Andersson
 1990 – Mona Malm, Sven Delblanc, Ulf Johanson
 1991 – Lars Gunnar Bodin
 1992 – Börje Ahlstedt, Harriet Andersson, Tomas Tranströmer
 1993 – Gösta Winbergh, Håkan Hagegård, Lars Forssell
 1994 – Sven-David Sandström
 1995 – Daniel Börtz, Lennart Hjulström
 1996 – Esa-Pekka Salonen, P. C. Jersild, Per Anders Fogelström, Solveig Ternström
 1997 – Bo Widerberg, Göran Tunström, Kristina Adolphson, Sara Lidman
 1998 – Kerstin Ekman, Georg Reidel, Gerda Antti, Margareta Ekström
 1999 – Björn Ulvaeus, Agneta Pleijel, Anne Sofie von Otter, Lennart Hellsing, Marie Göranzon, Stina Ekblad, Willy Kyrklund, Ylva Eggehorn
 2000 – Björn Granath, Hans Gefors, Krister Henriksson, Maria Gripe, Per Olov Enquist
 2001 – Anita Wall, Dan Laurin, Kim Anderzon, Majgull Axelsson, Mats Ek, Staffan Göthe, Staffan Valdemar Holm
 2002 – Staffan Göthe, Arne Domnérus, Loa Falkman, Jan Sandström, Lena Endre, Olle Adolphson, Pernilla August, Roland Pöntinen, Sven-Bertil Taube, Torgny Lindgren
 2003 – Marie Fredriksson, Eva Bergman, Håkan Hardenberger, Karin Rehnqvist, Kristina Lugn, Lars Amble
 2004 – Birgitta Trotzig, Catarina Ligendza, Christian Lindberg, Hillevi Martinpelto, Katarina Dalayman, Knut Ahnlund, Lena Nyman, Lil Terselius
 2005 – Bertil Norström, Eva Ström, Gunnel Vallquist, Ingvar Hirdwall, Irene Lindh, Jan Troell, Per Tengstrand, Per Wästberg, Peter Jablonski, Putte Wickman
 2006 – Henning Mankell, Bobo Stenson,  Inger Sandberg, Johan Rabaeus, Lars Gustafsson, Lasse Sandberg
 2007 – Reine Brynolfsson, Carola Häggkvist
 2008 – Carl-Göran Ekerwald, Alf Hambe, Gunnar Harding, Inga Landgré, Lars Norén, Malin Ek, Nina Stemme
 2009 – Katinka Faragó, Meg Westergren, Roy Andersson, Örjan Ramberg
 2010 – Bodil Malmsten, Dan Ekborg, Malin Hartelius
 2011 – Malena Ernman, Mats Bergström, Sten Ljunggren, Peter Mattei, Marie Richardson
 2012 – Anders Paulsson, Martin Fröst, Wilhelm Carlsson, Lena Josefsson, Charlotta Larsson, Jan-Erik Wikström
 2013 – Åke Lundqvist, Per Nyström, Vibeke Olsson Falk, Kristina Törnqvist, Sven Wollter
 2014 – Tomas von Brömssen, Pers Anna Larsson, Staffan Mårtensson, Ingela Olsson
 2015 – Rigmor Gustafsson, Livia Millhagen, Ann Petrén, Therese Brunnander
 2016 – Kerstin Avemo, Malin Byström, Anders Eljas, Nils Landgren, Lars Lerin, Magnus Lindgren, Elin Rombo, Johannes Öhman
 2017 – Elisabeth Eriksson, Ann Hallenberg, Elin Klinga, Lars Humble, Ola Larsmo, Lisa Nilsson
 2018 – Rolf Martinsson, Dan-Olof Stenlund, Iréne Theorin, Helen Sjöholm, Per Åhlin
 2019 – Gunilla Bergström, Lars Lind, Peter Andersson, Katarina Ewerlöf, Erland Hagegård, Bengt Krantz
 2020 – Kicki Bramberg, Lisa Larsson, Gunilla Röör, Gregor Zubicky, Gary Graden, Per Gudmundson, Sissela Kyle, Johan Ulveson, Ingrid Tobiasson

See also 
Orders, decorations, and medals of Sweden

References

External links 
 Litteris et Artibus

Orders, decorations, and medals of Sweden
Awards established in 1853
1853 establishments in Sweden